Tvillingderbyt ("The Twin Derby") is a football fixture in Stockholm, Sweden, between cross-town rivals AIK Stockholm and Djurgårdens IF. Both clubs were founded in Stockholm in 1891, AIK was first with Djurgårdens IF following three weeks later, but they started playing football in 1896 (AIK) and 1899 (Djurgårdens IF) respectively.

History

AIK started playing football in 1896, while Djurgårdens IF Fotboll started in 1899. The first football match between them was played on 16 July 1899 at Svea Lifgardes IP and resulted in a 2–1 AIK win.

Rivalry culture
The fixture between AIK and Djurgården is generally considered to be the most important derby in Sweden. It's a true archrivalry between Stockholm's two most successful clubs, with AIK having won a total of 12 Swedish Championships and 8 Swedish cups, while Djurgården has 12 titles and 5 Cups.

Both clubs were founded in 1891, just three weeks apart. Therefore, the derby is known as the Tvillingderbyt (The Twin derby). This fixture is listed among the fiercest derbies in the world. Since 1891, 231 fixtures have been contested in all competitions with 87 AIK wins and 82 Djurgården wins.

Both clubs have a large number of fans throughout Stockholm. There is somewhat of a geographical divide; Djurgården consider the affluent Östermalm district, the eastern part of Stockholm City Centre, their heartland, while AIK has a strong concentration of fans in the north, west and the centre of the city, roughly along the blue line of the Metro and stretching north in the Stockholm urban area. (Both clubs also maintain a cross-town rivalry with Hammarby IF, whose stronghold is the Södermalm district, the southern part of the city centre.)

The AIK-Djurgården rivalry is also found in ice hockey which further strengthens the tension between both sets of fans and makes the rivalry somewhat unique for Swedish sports. They are the only two clubs in Sweden who have won more than one championship in both football and ice hockey. (AIK have won 12 in football and 7 in ice hockey; Djurgården have won 12 in Football and 16 in ice hockey.)

Matches

AIK in the league at home

Djurgården in the league at home

Cup

Other

Records

Biggest wins (5+ goals)

Longest runs

Most consecutive wins

Most consecutive draws

Most consecutive matches without a draw

Longest undefeated runs

Longest undefeated runs (league)

Most consecutive matches without conceding a goal

Most consecutive games scoring

Most appearances

Goalscorers

Top scorers

Consecutive goalscoring

Clean sheets
Since 28 September 2009

Shared player history

Transfers

 Bengt Rosenqvist (AIK to Djurgården)
 Gunnar Galin (AIK to Djurgården to AIK to Djurgården to AIK to Djurgården to AIK) (1927, 1928, 1929, 1931)
 Algot Haglund (Djurgården to AIK) (1928)
 Bertil Andersson (AIK to Djurgården to AIK to Djurgården) (1928, 1928, 1929)
 Hugo Söderström (Djurgården to AIK to Djurgården) (1928, 1928)
 Carl-Ottil Johansson (AIK to Djurgården) (1948)
 Bernt Brick (AIK to Djurgården) (1954)
 Leif Skiöld (AIK to Djurgården) (1960)
 Hans Nilsson (Djurgården to AIK on loan) (1966)
 Joacim Sjöström (Djurgården to AIK) (1988)
 Branko Marković (AIK to Djurgården) (1984)
 Krister Nordin (Djurgården to AIK) (1992)
 Jan Andersson (Djurgården to AIK) (1993)
 Patrik Hagman (Djurgården to AIK) (1994)
 Jesper Jansson (AIK to Djurgården) (1996)
 Nebojša Novaković (Djurgården to AIK) (1997)
 Pierre Gallo (AIK to Djurgården) (1998)
 Andreas Johansson (AIK to Djurgården) (2000)
 Sharbel Touma (Djurgården to AIK) (1999)
 Kennedy Igboananike (Djurgården to AIK) (2012)

Played for both clubs

 Ulf Östlund (Djurgården to Hagalund to AIK) (1950)
 Lennart Pettersson (AIK to IFK Eskilstuna to Djurgården) (1951)
 Roland Magnusson (Djurgården to Altay to AIK) (1970)
 Ove Rübsamen (Djurgården to Helenelunds IK to AIK) (1977)
  Thomas Lundmark (AIK to IFK Eskilstuna to Djurgården) (1990)
 Bo Andersson (AIK to Vasalund to Djurgården) (1994)
 Anders Almgren (Djurgården to Vasalund to AIK) (1996)
 Pär Millqvist (Djurgården to IFK Göteborg to Örebro to Vasalund to AIK) (1996)
  Mikael Borgqvist (AIK to Spårvägen to Djurgården) (1998)
 Peter Hallström (AIK to Spånga to Värtan to Djurgården) (1998)
 Martin Åslund (Djurgården to IFK Norrköping to AIK) (1999)
 Anders Limpar (AIK to Colorado Rapids to Djurgården) (2000)
 Christer Mattiasson (AIK to Lillestrøm to Djurgården) (2001)
 Kevin Walker (AIK to GIF Sundsvall to Djurgården) (2015)

Played for one club, managed the other
 Kim Bergstrand (played for AIK, manages Djurgården)
 Kjell Jonevret (played for AIK, managed Djurgården)
 Per Kaufeldt (played for AIK, managed AIK and Djurgården)
 Putte Kock (played for AIK, managed Djurgården)
 Thomas Lagerlöf (played for AIK, manages Djurgården)
 Bo Petersson (played for AIK, managed AIK and Djurgården)

Managed both clubs

1 Only competitive matches are counted.

See also
Football derbies in Sweden
Local derby
Major football rivalries
Sports rivalry
Djurgårdens IF–Hammarby IF rivalry
AIK Fotboll–Hammarby Fotboll rivalry

References

Football derbies in Sweden
AIK Fotboll
Djurgårdens IF Fotboll
Football in Stockholm
Recurring sporting events established in 1899
1899 establishments in Sweden